Minuscule 2756 (in the Gregory-Aland numbering), is a Greek minuscule manuscript of the New Testament. Dated paleographically to the 13th century.

Description 
The codex contains a complete text of the four Gospels, on 195 parchment leaves (18.7 cm by 14.5 cm). Written in one column per page, in 25 lines per page.

Kurt Aland did not place it in any Category.
According to the Claremont Profile Method it represents the textual family Πb in Luke 1 and Luke 20. In Luke 10 no profile was made.

The codex now is housed at Bible Museum Münster (Ms. 10).

See also 

 List of New Testament minuscules
 Textual criticism
 Biblical manuscript
 Bible Museum Münster

References

External links 

 Manuscripts of the Bible Museum 
 Images of manuscript 2756 at the CSNTM 

Greek New Testament minuscules
13th-century biblical manuscripts